Michel Majerus (June 9, 1967 – November 6, 2002) was a Luxembourgish artist who combined painting with digital media in his work. 
He lived and worked in Berlin until his untimely death in a plane crash in November 2002.

His work was featured in a number of solo and group exhibitions in Europe and North America, most notably the "Pop Reloaded" exhibition in Los Angeles.

Early life and education 
Majerus was born in Esch-sur-Alzette, Luxembourg in 1967. In 1986, Majerus began to study at the State Academy of Fine Arts Stuttgart, graduating in 1992.

Work
In 1992, together with his fellow students from Stuttgart Nader (Ahriman), Stephan Jung, Susa Reinhardt and Wawa (Wawrzyniec) Tokarski, Majerus co-founded the artist group 3K-NH for which they used the initials of their nicknames to form a cryptic code name. 3K-NH held exhibitions both in Stuttgart and Berlin. In 1993, Majerus and Jung moved to Berlin.

Painting was Majerus’s preferred medium of expression, but his creative horizon extended to many aspects of popular culture, from computer games, digital imagery, film, television, and pop music to trademarks and corporate logos. His paintings' stylistic quotations include excerpts from Andy Warhol, Willem de Kooning and Jean-Michel Basquiat, video games and other pop-culture sources. 

In 1996, Majerus began his MoM Block series, comprising more than 170 canvases; MoM is an abbreviation of Modehaus Mitte, a former fashion factory in East Berlin, in which Majerus had his studio for a while.

Majerus did not limit himself to two-dimensional surfaces, but created dynamic, painted installations which surround the viewer. For a 1994 outing at his Berlin gallery Neugerriemschneider then-recently inaugurated space, he asked that a road be paved inside the modest exhibition space. In 1999, at the invitation of curator Harald Szeemann, he painted the façade of the international pavilion in the Giardini of the Venice Biennale. For his largest work, if you are dead, so it is (2000), Majerus covered the interior surface of a  skateboarders' half-pipe.

After moving to Los Angeles in 2000 through the German Academic Exchange Service (DAAD), Majerus began work on a series of thirty large-format paintings incorporating digital media and animated videos. Completed in Berlin the following year, the series eventually comprised over thirty works. Nine of these works would eventually become the "Pop Reloaded" exhibition in Los Angeles. "Pop Reloaded" emphasised the visual confusion of urban landscapes and the scale and domination imposed by freeway billboards and office towers. It drew on works by Cy Twombly, Mark Rothko and Gerhard Richter in inscribing logos and detail on the dull greys and blacks of a cityscape. The paintings were accompanied by a video of a constantly changing image of Majerus' signature, to illustrate the idea of celebrity as a constantly changing concept.

In 2002, shortly after his return from Los Angeles, Majerus installed a life-size photograph of a Brutalist social housing block directly in front of the East side of Brandenburg Gate; the other side was taken over by a work of Thomas Bayrle. Majerus was working on an exhibition entitled "Project Space" for Tate Liverpool when he died.

Exhibitions

Majerus' artwork first came to international attention in 1996 with an exhibition at the Kunsthalle in Stuttgart, and then with subsequent exhibitions in Munster and Dundee ('Colour Me Blind! - Painting In The Age of Computer Games And Comics', 2000). In 1996 the Kunsthalle Basel organized a mid-career museum retrospective.

In 1998, Majerus was invited to participate in Manifesta 2. He participated in the Venice Biennale in 1999, where he covered the facade of the main Italian Pavilion with a mural he designed. 

Since his death, several European museums have organized exhibitions of Majerus’ work including the Hamburger Bahnhof (2003), the Tate Liverpool (2004), the Kunsthaus Graz (2005), and the Kunstmuseum Stuttgart (2011). A posthumous exhibition of his works was featured at the Kunstmuseum of Wolfsburg (Germany) in 2003. Entitled “Painting Pictures”, the exhibition was a celebration of Majerus' genre and was dedicated to his memory. Other painters represented in “Painting Pictures” included Takashi Murakami, Sarah Morris, Franz Ackermann, Matthew Ritchie, Torben Giehler and Erik Parker. Commencing in 2005, approximately two hundred of Majerus' works have been displayed as the "European Retrospective" travelling exhibition. The exhibition was a collaboration between the Majerus family and the Galerie Neugerriemschneider, Berlin. It included works usually displayed at the Hamburger Bahnhof, Berlin, the Kunsthaus - Landesmuseum Joanneum, Graz and from private collections throughout the world (Argentina, Austria, Belgium, Spain, Germany, Great-Britain, Greece, Italy, Luxembourg, Mexico, Portugal, USA).. 

In 2018, the Institute of Contemporary Art Boston included a painting by Majerus in a survey of art after the internet, placing it within the context of works by Jon Rafman, Cao Fei, Avery Singer, and others. His first museum survey in the United States opened at the ICA Miami in 2022. Opening twenty years after the death, the exhibition series Michel Majerus 2022 – which unfolded across Germany and included KW Institute for Contemporary Art, Neuer Berliner Kunstverein, Kunstverein in Hamburg, among others – was dedicated to various phases and aspects of the artist’s oeuvre.

Death
In November 2002, Majerus was killed aboard Luxair Flight 9642 while travelling from Berlin to Luxembourg.

Influence
Thomas Bayrle played with elements from two of Majerus’s paintings to create a silk-screened wallpaper, Majerus (Smudge Tool/XXX) I (2013). In 2020, Takashi Murakami made paintings that borrow some of Majerus’s imagery.

References

External links
 Michel Majerus at Mudam

1967 births
2002 deaths
Luxembourgian artists
People from Esch-sur-Alzette
20th-century Luxembourgian painters
20th-century male artists
Victims of aviation accidents or incidents in Luxembourg
Victims of aviation accidents or incidents in 2002
Male painters